Richard Hayward may refer to:
 Richard Hayward (sculptor) (1725–1800) British sculptor
 Richard Hayward (Florida politician), one of the mayors of Tallahassee, Florida
 Richard Hayward (actor) (1892–1964), Irish film actor, writer and musician
 Richard Hayward (cricketer) (born 1954), former English cricketer
 Richard Hayward (linguist), professor of linguistics
 Richard Arthur Hayward (born 1947), tribal chairman of the Mashantucket Pequot Tribe
 Richie Hayward (1946–2010), drummer in the band Little Feat
 Rick Hayward, British businessman

See also
 Rick Hayward (ice hockey), Canadian ice hockey player